Placida is a genus of very small  or minute sea slugs, marine opisthobranch gastropod mollusks in the family Limapontiidae.

Although similar in appearance to nudibranchs, species in this genus are actually Sacoglossans.

Species 
Species within this genus include:
 Placida aoteana (Powell, 1937)
 Placida babai Ev. Marcus, 1982
 Placida barackobamai McCarthy, Krug & Valdés, 2017 
 Placida brevirhina (Trinchese, 1874)
 Placida brookae McCarthy, Krug & Valdés, 2017 
 Placida cremoniana (Trinchese, 1892)
 Placida dakariensis (Pruvot-Fol, 1953)
 Placida dendritica (Alder and Hancock, 1843)
 Placida fralila Burn, 1966
 Placida kevinleei McCarthy, Krug & Valdés, 2017
 Placida kingstoni T. E. Thompson, 1977
 Placida saronica (T.E. Thompson, 1988)
 Placida sudamericana Cetra, Gutiérrez Gregoric & Roche, 2021
 Placida tardyi (Trinchese, 1873)
 Placida verticillata Ortea, 1981
 Placida viridis (Trinchese, 1873)
Synonyms
 Placida brevicornis (A. Costa, 1867): synonym of Placida dendritica (Alder & Hancock, 1843)
 Taxa inquirenda
 Placida capensis Macnae, 1954 
 Placida daguilarensis Jensen, 1990 (taxon inquirendum)

References

 Powell A. W. B., New Zealand Mollusca, William Collins Publishers Ltd, Auckland, New Zealand 1979 
 
  Jensen K.E. (2007) Biogeography of the Sacoglossa (Mollusca, Opisthobranchia). Bonner Zoologische Beiträge 55:255–281.

External links
 Anonymous. (1873). 19ª Sessione ordinaria, 3 aprile 1873 (preliminary presentation of Trinchese's Memoir to be published in 1874, making some names available). Rendiconto delle sessioni della R. Accademia delle scienze dell'Istituto di Bologna, Classe di scienze fisiche. 1872-1873: 133-134

Limapontiidae